Sing Sing Nights may refer to:

Sing Sing Nights (novel), a 1928 novel by American author Harry Stephen Keeler
Sing Sing Nights (film), a 1934 American film based on the novel and directed by Lewis D. Collins